Kevin Barlow, was a British-Australian drugs smuggler who was executed in Malaysia in 1986.

Kevin Barlow may also refer to:

J. Kevin Barlow, AIDS activist
Kevan Barlow (born 1979), American footballer

See also
 Kevin Barrow